Motorav  Industria  is a Brazilian aircraft engine manufacturer, located in Bocaiúva, Minas Gerais. The company builds engines for use in ultralight and homebuilt aircraft.

Aircraft Engines

See also
AeroConversions AeroVee Engine

References

Bibliography

Aircraft engine manufacturers of Brazil
Companies based in Minas Gerais
Brazilian brands